Poshtehan (also Romanized as Poshtehān and Poshtahān; also known as Poshtān, Poshtehān-e Bozorg, Pushtagan, and Pushtān) is a village in Dasht-e Veyl Rural District, Rahmatabad and Blukat District, Rudbar County, Gilan Province, Iran. At the 2006 census, its population was 332, in 82 families.

References 

Populated places in Rudbar County